The Northern Kentucky Norse women's basketball team represents Northern Kentucky University in Highland Heights, Kentucky, United States.

History
The Norse began play in 1974. From 1985 to 2012, they played in the Great Lakes Valley Conference. From 2012 to 2015, they played in the Atlantic Sun Conference, now known as the ASUN Conference, before joining the Horizon League. As of the end of the 2015–16 season, they have an all-time record of 880–361. In 2000, the Norse won the NCAA Women's Division II Basketball Championship in overtime 71–62 over North Dakota State. This was the first title in the history of the school. In 2003, they finished as runner-up to South Dakota State 65–50. In 2008, the Norse beat South Dakota 63–58 to win their second championship. In their first season in Division I (2012–13), they finished 15–13, but they were invited to the Women's Basketball Invitational. The following year, they went to the second round of the WBI. They also made the WBI in 2016.

Postseason results
The Norse had a 27–18 record from twenty NCAA Tournament appearances at the Division II level.

NCAA Division II tournament results

References

External links